An infodemic  is a rapid and far-reaching spread of both accurate and inaccurate information about something, such as a disease. The word is a portmanteau of "information" and "epidemic." As facts, rumors, and fears mix and disperse, it becomes difficult to learn essential information about an issue. In 2020, alongside the COVID-19 pandemic, an infodemic of disinformation raises concerns for information quality in online environment. This effect was demonstrated in a study of news stories shared on Twitter; in the study, news stories rated as incorrect by fact-checking organizations spread to far more people than factual articles did.

History
In his 11 May 2003 article in the Washington Postalso published in Newsday, The Record, the Oakland Tribune, and the China Dailyforeign policy expert David Rothkopf, referred to the information epidemicor "infodemic", in the context of the 2002–2004 SARS outbreak. The outbreak of SARS, which was caused by Severe acute respiratory syndrome coronavirus 1 began in a remote region in Guangdong, China in November 2002. By the time the outbreak ended in May 2003, it had reached 30 countries and there were over 8,000 confirmed cases and 774 deaths. Rothkopf, who was at that time, a member of the advisory committee's board of directors at the Johns Hopkins Bloomberg School of Public Health's Johns Hopkins Center for Health Security which provides policy recommendations to the United States government and the World Health Organization, said that the infodemic was the second of two concurrent epidemics. Rothkopf described how the "information epidemic" transformed SARS from a regional health crisis into a "debacle" that spread globally with both economic and social repercussions. He said this infodemic "was not the rapid spread of simple news via the media, nor is it simply the rumor mill on steroids. Rather, as with SARS, it is a complex phenomenon caused by the interaction of mainstream media, specialist media and internet sites, and "informal" media, which is to say wireless phones, text messaging, pagers, faxes, and e-mail, all transmitting some combination of fact, rumor, interpretation, and propaganda." Rothkopf citing the State Department, said that 2002 was the "year of the most heightened state of terrorism panic in our history" even though terrorism globally had decreased to its "lowest level since 1969". His company, the Washington DC-based strategic intelligence and analysis firm, Intellibridge, which he had founded in 1999, tracked the January 2003 Chinese reports on the outbreak. On 9 February 2003, Intellibridge provided their analysis to the U.S. defense community, and then posted the information on ProMED, a Federation of American Scientists Web site. The general public did not learn of the outbreak until 23 February 2003, when an elderly woman died of SARS in her home in Toronto, Canada, from Hong Kong. Her son, who spread the disease in a Toronto hospital also died. With the first death in North America, the Western media began to cover the outbreak. Rothkopf said that if more had been done earlier to manage the disease as well as information about SARS, perhaps there might not have been a worldwide panic. The infodemic spread globally, far beyond the countries that had SARS victims and "set off a chain reaction of economic and social consequences". It also made it harder for health organizations to control the SARS epidemic as panic spread online.

In his 15 December 2002 article entitled "Infodemiology: The epidemiology of (mis)information" in The American Journal of Medicine, health researcher Gunther Eysenbach coined the term "infodemiolgist".and later used the term to refer to attempts at digital disease detection.  

The United Nations and the World Health Organization began using the term "infodemic" during the COVID-19 pandemic as early as 2 February 2020. The related term "disinfodemic" (referring to COVID-19 disinformation campaigns) has been used by UNESCO. By the time that the Journal of Medical Internet Research published their June 2020 issue featuring the WHO's framework for managing the infodemic related to the COVID-19 pandemic, the WHO and public health agencies had acknowledged infodemiology as an "emerging scientific field" that was of critical importance during a pandemic. By 2021, the WHO had published a number of resources clarifying the infodemic.

A Royal Society and British Academy joint report published in October 2020 said of infodemics that: "COVID-19 vaccine deployment faces an infodemic with misinformation often filling the knowledge void, characterised by: (1) distrust of science and selective use of expert authority, (2) distrust in pharmaceutical companies and government, (3) straightforward explanations, (4) use of emotion; and, (5) echo chambers," and to combat the ill and "inoculate the public" endorsed the Singaporean POFMA legislation, which criminalises misinformation. The Aspen Institute even started their misinformation project before the pandemic.

A blue-ribbon working group on infodemics, from the Forum on Information and Democracy, produced a report in November 2020, highlighting 250 recommendations to protect democracies, human rights, and health.

The Merriam-Webster Dictionary tracked its renewed usage during the COVID-19 pandemic.

The term was used by academics in reference to misininformation.

In a 2018 journal article on how false news spreads published in Science, researchers said that, based on data from Twitter from 2006 to 2017, it was rare for more than 1000 people to engage with a tweet that was true compared to engagement with false news that reached between 1000 and 100,000 people, and with a much faster diffusion.

Definitions
In his 11 May 2003 article in the Post, Rothkopf wrote that the information epidemic or "infodemic" was a "combination of "[a] few facts, mixed with fear, speculation, and rumor, amplified and relayed swiftly worldwide by modern information technologies." 

On 2 February 2020, the World Health Organization defined an infodemic as a "an over-abundance of informationsome accurate and some notthat makes it hard for people to find trustworthy sources and reliable guidance when they need it." A 21 February 2021 WHO publication, said that "[a]n infodemic is too much information including false or misleading information in digital and physical environments during a disease outbreak."

Eysenbach described "infodemiology" as the study of "the determinants and distribution of health information and misinformation".

Research on Infodemic during Covid-19
As COVID-19 swept across the globe, information about how to stay safe and how to identify symptoms became vital. However, especially in the first phases of the pandemic, the amount of false, not validated and partially true information on the media was huge. Even seemingly reliable government sources did not always follow best practices in disseminating data about COVID-19, with many potentially misleading maps published on official websites. There was also a proliferation of systematic reviews of COVID-19-related evidence, not all of which was robustly conducted.  A U.S. based survey research revealed that during March and April 2020 higher news consumption about Covid-19, especially through social media, was associated with lower levels of knowledge and more fake news beliefs. However, preliminary research published in fall 2021 suggested that visual information (e.g., infographics) about science and scientists, designed to address trust, might be able to mitigate belief in misinformation about COVID-19.

Combatting infodemics 
Researchers have been seeking tools to combat Infodemic. Gunther Eysenbach brought up four pillars of infodemic management: (1) information monitoring (infoveillance); (2) building eHealth Literacy and science literacy capacity; (3) encouraging knowledge refinement and quality improvement processes such as fact-checking and peer-review; and (4) accurate and timely knowledge translation which minimizes distorting factors such as political or commercial influences. Scholars also advocate for tech platforms to police their content more effectively, and empower individuals to make better decisions on their own to promote the emergence of truth. Social media companies may offer a variety of cues to help people make better judgments of whether a message is legitimate or not. For example, Facebook might, in addition to showing how many "likes" a post has received, allow the count of "dislikes" to offer a more symmetric view of opinions.

Criticism
Financial Times journalist Siddharth Venkataramakrishnan said in his 20 August 2021 article that casting the spread of misinformation and disinformation in terms of disease risks oversimplifying the problem and that "unlike the status of being healthy or infected by an actual disease, what constitutes accurate information is also subject to change." Venkataramakrishnan also pointed out that the focus of the infodemic has often been on "conspiracy theorists and snake-oil salesmen", largely ignoring the at times problematic actions and confusing messaging of governments and public health bodies throughout the pandemic.

Communication scholars Felix Simon and Chico Camargo at Oxford University said in their 20 July 2021 New Media & Society article that "infodemic" as metaphor can be misleading, as it conflates multiple forms of social behaviour, oversimplifies a complex situation and helps constitute a phenomenon for which concrete evidence remains patchy." Pointing out that the infodemic as a concept is "journalistically powerful, intuitively satisfying, and in strong resonance with personal experiences and intuition", Simon and Camargo argue that empirical evidence for many of the claims surrounding the term is lacking. Instead of a genuine phenomenon they see the infodemic as "a territorial claim for those who want to apply their skills, a signal to others that they are working in this area, or a framing device to tie one's work to larger debates".

See also
Collective consciousness
Information overload
Meme
Memetic engineering
Memetic warfare
Propaganda

References

information
Misinformation
Communication of falsehoods